Everett Kelly may refer to:
 Everett A. Kelly, American politician, member of the Florida House of Representatives
 Everett E. Kelly, American football player
 E. Lowell Kelly, American clinical psychologist and professor of psychology